The Parsevals were 22 airships built between 1909 and 1919 by the Luft-Fahrzeug-Gesellschaft (LFG) following the design of August von Parseval. In the 1920s and 1930s, three more airships were built following the Parseval-Naatz (PN) design.

As with the rival Zeppelins, the airships were, in both English and German, referred to by the name of the inventor. (In German, the nouns were masculine, that is, "der Parseval", "der Zeppelin".)

In contrast to the Zeppelins, the Parsevals were non-rigid or semi-rigid airships, with little or no stiffening structure inside the fabric envelope. The Zeppelins had a rigid internal framework made of duralumin. Both types relied on hydrogen gas to provide lift.

Experimental airship

The Versuchsluftschiff (meaning experimental airship) was Parseval's first model. It was rebuilt several times.
First flight on 26 May 1906 at Berlin's Tegel, a military field
Pilot: Captain von Krogh
Length: 48 m, Diameter: 4.8 m
Power plant: 62 kW (85 PS) Daimler-Motor
Max speed: 43.2 km/h
The hull was completed by the balloon constructer Riedinger and was later increased from 2300 to 2800 cubic metre, the length increased to 50 m
After all the modifications were completed, from 1909 it was designated "PL 1".

PL 1

Developed from the Versuchluftschiff
Maiden flight: 1909-09-21
Volume: 3200 m³, 60 m length, 9.4 m Diameter
Power plant: a 62 kW (85 PS) Daimler-Motor, a 4.25 m-prop
On 21 and 22 September 1909 three test flights, improvements to steering and hull, afterwards transported by train Zug to Zürich for the Gordon Bennet Ballon-Races, four demonstration flights in Zürich. The Swiss airship department provided gas filling services, and the chief of the Swiss military general staff was among the passengers for the first flight over Swiss soil.
In February 1910 was used as the "Kaiserliche Aero-Klub-Luftschiff" (Imperial air-club airship) and in Bitterfeld until its end of service
20 Flights between 21 September 1909 und 21 April 1910, the last flight a forced landing
Experimented with an image projector (see also PL 6 where advertising images were projected on the hull)

PL 2 / P.I

Built for the Prussian army, under the marking P.I, construction similar to the PL 1.
Maiden flight: 1908-08-13, in service until 1912 then dismantled.
Volume: 4000 m³
Length: 60 m, Diameter: 10.4 m
Power plant: a 62 kW (85 PS) Daimler-Motor with one airprop
45 km/h max speed

PL 3 / P.II

After seven flights, the hull volume was enlarged on 1909-03-23 from 5600 to 6600m³, refilling starts 1909-06-05, length remains at 70 m, diameter increased by one metre to 11.3 m, test flight 1909-06-28 in Bitterfeld
Regular passenger flights with up to seven passengers and 4 crew from the International air exhibition in Frankfurt/Main from 7 August until the end of October 1909. Total 74 flights.
Put out of service after flying into the sea on 1910-05-16
Power plant: two 81 kW (110 PS) N.A.G.-Motors, each driving a four-bladed airprop
max speed: 51 km/h

PL 4 - M I

PL 4 was purchased by the Kaiserlich und königlich Military-aero-nautical institute and stationed in Fischamend, Wien-Umgebung under the designation "M I"
Maiden flight: 26. November 1909
Volume: 2300 m³,
Power plant: Austro-Daimler-Motors from Wiener Neustadt, either 1x 62 kW or 2x 33 kW (1x 85 or 2x 45 PS), each of which driving a single airprop
Hull built by an Austrian rubber factory in Wimpassing im Schwarzatale
Length: 50 m, Diameter 12.5 m,
Flying ceiling: 1000 metre
Crew: 2-3, passengers: 4-5 (capacity for 7 persons in total)

PL 5

Over 150 passenger flights
Stationed at Flughafen Klein Gandau in Breslau (Wroclaw, Poland)
On 1911-06-11 destroyed in a fire while emptying the gas hull in Münden, later replaced by PL 9
Volume 1350 m³
Max speed: 
Flight duration 5 hours
Flying ceiling: 1,000 metres
Crew and passengers: 3 to 4

PL 6

Maiden flight 1910-06-30,
Intended for round trips
Up to 12 passengers, 4 crew,
First use of night air advertising on an airship, a projector could project images on its hull
Modernised in 1912 to bring it to same technical standard as the PL 12, volume increased from 6800 to 8000 m³

PL 7 Grif 

Delivered to Russia with the marking Grif (Griffin), see also Russian airships
Volume: 6700 m³
Length 72 m, diameter 14 m
Max speed: , possibly  with only 6 persons
Flight duration: 20 hours or longer
Flight ceiling: 2500 metre
Crew and passengers: 12-16
Crew: 3-4
The Luft-Fahrzeug-Gesellschaft brochure shows the PL 7 (Type B), intended for the Russian military, one of its six-cylinder 100 PS engines, and its gondola with two engines driving semi-rigid props

PL 8 Ersatz P.II

PL 8 delivered to Prussian army on 1913-03-12, with marking Ersatz P.II (P.II replacement)
Volume: 5600 m³
Max speed: 16–17 m/s
Flight duration: >= 20 h
Flight ceiling: 2000 m
Passengers and crew: 7-12
Crew: 4
Power plant: Two 150 PS engines each driving a four-bladed airprop

PL 9
Stationed at Flughafen Klein Gandau in Breslau (Wroclaw, Poland)
1913 sold to the Turkish military
First flight in Yeşilköy occurred on 23 July 1913.

PL 10 Sportsluftschiff
PL 10 1700 m³ Sportsluftschiff after the first flight in 1910 dismantled and stored in Bitterfeld

PL 11 - P.III 
PL 11 first flight 1912-03-01, for the Prussian Army designated as P.III until middle 1914

PL 12 Charlotte 
Charlotte getauft,
Built for the "Rheinisch-Westfälischen Flug- und Sportplatz-Gesellschaft mbH Wanne - Herten", where it was used for roundtrips
Maiden flight: 1912-05-11
PL 12 was used as a passenger and advertising airship until 1914.
Length 82 m, diameter 14 m
Power plant: 2x 81 kW (110 PS) NAG-engines
Volume: 8000 m³
Max speed: 48 km/h

PL 13 Yuhi
1912 delivered as Yuhi(雄飛号) to Japan、In 1916 January 22 Yuhi flew from Tokorozawa to Osaka.
January 22 is the memorial day of "skyship" in Japan.

PL 14 Burewestnik 
Delivered as Burewestnik to Russia

PL 15 - M 3 
1914 delivered as "M 3" to Italy

PL 16 - P.IV 
Maiden flight: 1913-10-02
Middle of 1914 delivered to the Prussian army, where it was renamed "P.IV"
In service until 1916-03-24

PL 17
Maiden flight: 1912-12-30
Delivered to Italy where it served in the army until 1915

PL 18 - No.4

Maiden flight: 23. April 1913
1913 delivered to the Royal Navy, under the marking "Parseval No.4". The British would describe its service as very successful
Length: 80 m; diameter: 15 m; volume: 8800 m³.
Power plant: 2x 132 kW (180 PS) Maybach-engines, max speed 68 km/h,
Crew: 2 officers and 7 men. Radio and Weaponry installed
Served during the World War I as patrol ship, demobilised in July 1917

PL 19 
PL 19 was intended for the British Royal Navy as "Parseval No.5", but upon war's outbreak was used instead by the German Navy. In England Vickers constructed three replacement hulls and 2 gondolas with identical specifications.
Maiden flight: 30 August 1914
Length: 92 m; Diameter: 15 m; Volume: 10,000 m³
Power plant: two 132 kW (180 PS) Maybach-engines, max speed: 76 km/h,
On 1915-01-25 after an air attack on Liepāja, Latvia, due to artillery damage made emergency sea-landing and crew taken as Russian prisoners of war

PL 20 - PL 24
PL 20-24 were not built.

PL 25

See: Parseval PL25
PL 25 was a military airship made in 1914/1915. It was the last single-gondola Parseval airship. It made its first flight on 1915-02-25, entered Navy service until 1916, after 95 flights.

PL 26
PL 26 was a semirigid airship whose maiden flight was on 1915-10-26, but it had an accident upon landing and was destroyed in a fire, with no casualties.
Length: 157 m, maximum diameter: 19.5 m
Volume: 31,300 m³
Max speed: 100 km/h
Power plant: four 177 kW (240 PS) Maybach-engines

PL 27
PL27's maiden flight was on 1917-03-08. The major difference from its predecessor PL 26 was the specification of the gondola. Because it no longer met increased military requirements, it was not put to military service but instead converted to a passenger airship in 1919. The Treaty of Versailles resulted in its dismantlement in 1920.
Length: 157 m, maximum diameter: 19.5 m
Volume: 31,300 m³
Maximum speed: 100 km/h
Power plant: four 177 kW (240 PS) Maybach-engines
Lifting capacity 18 tonne

Parseval-Naatz PN 28
Semirigid airship
Trumpf-advertising airship, (like the Raab-Katzenstein RK 27)
Built in Seddin/Pommern by the Berlin "Wasser- und Luftfahrzeug GmbH"
Maiden flighton 1929-06-06 in Berlin
Official marking: D-PN28
Volume: 1800 m³

Parseval-Naatz PN 29 Sidenhuset
Semirigid airship
Built in 1929 as D-PN 29 with a passenger capacity of 5
Volume: 2300 m³
Length: 44 m, diameter: 10 m
Power plant: one Siemens-Halske-engine of 75 kW (100 PS)
Max speed  82 km/h
Total flying time: about 600 hours in 200 flights

On 1930-05-21 PN 29 acquired the Swedish call-sign "SE-ACG Sidenhuset", after the then well-known ladies boutique from Stockholm. The word "Sidenhuset" was displayed in large letters on its hull. The owner was "AB Luftskeppsreklam i Stockholm" (Airship Advertising Co).

Sidenhuset's task was to make advertising flights over the 1930 Stockholm Exhibition (Stockholmsutställningen). The airship was damaged by wind due to its being parked outside. The manufacturer arrived and it was decided to fly the ship back to Germany for repairs. During the fight it crashed into the Baltic Sea, south of the island of Öland, on  1930-06-04. The airship sank, but with no casualties.

Parseval - Naatz PN 30 Odol

PN 30 flew under the callsign Odol as an advertising and research airship.

Callsign: D-PN 30
Length: 46 m
Maximum diameter: 10.8 m
Volume: 2600 m³
Maximum speed: 80 km/h
Power plant: 160 PS Siemens and Halske
Maiden flight: July 1932

See also
List of Zeppelins
List of Schütte-Lanz airships

Notes

Bibliography 

 Schmitt, G. und Schwipps, W. - Pioniere der frühen Luftfahrt, Gondrom Verlag, Blindlach 1995, 
 Haaland, D.; Knäusel, H.G.; Schmidt, G. und Seifert, J. - Leichter als Luft - Ballone und Luftschiffe, Die Deutsche Luftfahrt Bd. 26, Bernard & Graefe Verlag, Bonn 1997, 
 Reid, A. - The Parseval Airships, Lulu online publishing, 2015.
 Seifert, Dr. Jürgen - Die Luftschiffwerft und die Abteilung Seeflugzeugbau der Luft-Fahrzeug-Gesellschaft in Bitterfeld (1908 - 1920) Bitterfeld 1988, ISBN (none)
 
Luftschiffahrt, Dem heutigen Stande der Wissenschaft entsprechend dargestellt von Regierungsbaumeister K. Hackstetter, Oberingenieur Siegfried Hartmann, Regierungsrat Hofmann, Leutnant Ernst Mickel, Emil Sandt, Oberleutnant a. D. Stelling, Dr.P. Schulze, und Graf Ferdinand von Zeppelin, 1908

External links

 Jean-Pierre Lauwers (Rosebud) Archive, images of early airships

Lists of airships
Airships of Germany
Parseval
Aviation in World War I
1900s German aircraft
1910s German aircraft
1920s German aircraft
German military aircraft